Islam Gaber (born 1 May 1996) is an Egyptian professional footballer who plays as a midfielder for Egyptian Premier League club Zamalek and the Egypt national team.

International
He made his debut for the Egypt national football team on 26 March 2019 in a friendly against Nigeria.

Honours
Zamalek

Egyptian Premier League 2020-21, 2021-22

Egypt Cup: 2018–19 , 2021
Egyptian Super Cup: 2019–20
 CAF Super Cup: 2020

References

External links

1996 births
Living people
Egyptian footballers
Egypt international footballers
Association football midfielders
Egyptian Premier League players
Misr Lel Makkasa SC players
El Dakhleya SC players
Zamalek SC players
Eastern Company SC players